"Anything For You" is a 1988 ballad written by Cuban-American singer and songwriter Gloria Estefan and sung by Estefan and Miami Sound Machine. The song appeared on their 1987 album Let It Loose. After years of fluctuating success in the United States, "Anything for You" marked a breakthrough for the group when it topped the Billboard magazine Hot 100 chart on May 14, 1988, and remained there for two weeks. It was the first of three number-ones for Estefan. Due to the success of the single, the album Let It Loose was re-released with the title Anything For You outside North America . The song also spent three weeks at #1 on the Adult Contemporary chart and peaked at #3 on the Hot Latin Tracks on June 25, 1988. 

In the UK, "Anything for You" was released in July 1988 and entered at #87, beginning a steady twelve-week climb which peaked at #10 by September 1988.

Background
The A-side of the single contained a longer fade than the version on the album. The B-side of the single was a Spanglish version of the song, with Estefan alternating the verses and chorus between English and Spanish. The song also appeared on the compilation album Exitos de Gloria Estefan, sung completely in Spanish and retitled "No Te Olvidaré (I Won't Forget You)."  The song was re-released in its original form in The Essential Gloria Estefan and in a slightly extended version in Gloria Estefan Greatest Hits (the 7" single version).

Critical reception
Pan-European magazine Music & Media described the song as "a glowing and highly atmospheric ballad in a glamorous production."

Music video
The music video for "Anything for You" was directed by Maurice Phillips.

Charts and certifications

Weekly charts

Year-end charts

All-time charts

Certifications

Formats and track listings

Official versions
Original versions
 Album Version — (3:42)
 Single/Video Version — (4:02)
 Spanish Version ("No Te Olvidaré") — (4:02)
 English/Spanish Version — (4:03)

Release history

Cover versions
 Lea Salonga for her second studio album, Lea (1988).
 Nina
 Aiza Seguerra
 Charice from her Chapter 10 album.
 Sharon Cuneta, Taglish version from the Buy One Take One soundtrack album
 El Poder Del Norte

Footnotes

External links

1988 singles
Gloria Estefan songs
Billboard Hot 100 number-one singles
Cashbox number-one singles
Songs written by Gloria Estefan
Song recordings produced by Emilio Estefan
Pop ballads
1987 songs
Epic Records singles